Adelaide is an unincorporated community located near Camilla, Georgia, United States. Camilla is located in Mitchell County.

The community once had a post office.

References

Unincorporated communities in Mitchell County, Georgia
Unincorporated communities in Georgia (U.S. state)